
Gmina Stara Kiszewa is a rural gmina (administrative district) in Kościerzyna County, Pomeranian Voivodeship, in northern Poland.

The gmina contains part of the protected area called Wdydze Landscape Park.

Villages
Gmina Stara Kiszewa contains the villages and settlements of Bąk, Bartoszylas, Bestra Suka, Bożepole Szlacheckie, Chrósty, Chwarzenko, Chwarzno, Cięgardło, Czerniki, Dolne Maliki, Drzewiny, Dubryk, Foshuta, Góra, Górne Maliki, Grzybno, Hamerbark, Kalk, Kobyle, Konarzyny, Kozia, Łasinek, Lipy, Lisia Huta, Madera, Nowe Polaszki, Nowiny, Nowy Bukowiec, Nowy Dworzec, Olpuch, Olpuch-Dworzec, Pałubin, Pikowo, Portygała, Ruda, Stara Kiszewa, Stare Polaszki, Stary Bukowiec, Struga, Strzelki, Tramkule, Warszawa, Wilcze Błota Kościerskie, Wygonin, Zamek Kiszewski and Zomrze.

Neighbouring gminas
Gmina Stara Kiszewa is bordered by the gminas of Czersk, Kaliska, Karsin, Kościerzyna, Liniewo, Skarszewy and Zblewo.

References
Polish official population figures 2006

Stara Kiszewa
Kościerzyna County